Alectrurus is a genus of South American birds in the tyrant flycatcher family Tyrannidae.

The genus contains the following two species:

References

 
Bird genera
Taxonomy articles created by Polbot
Taxa named by Louis Jean Pierre Vieillot